Senator Richards may refer to:

Graham Richard (born 1944), Indiana State Senate
DeForest Richards (1846–1903), Wyoming State Senate
Emerson Lewis Richards (1884–1963), New Jersey State Senate
Frank H. Richards (1858–1937), Washington State Senate
George Richards (Warren County, NY) (fl. 1840s–1850s), New York State Senate
John K. Richards (1856–1909), Ohio State Senate
John Richards (Pennsylvania politician) (1753–1822), Pennsylvania State Senate
Lynn S. Richards (1901–2001), Utah State Senate
Ralph Richards (1809–1883), New York State Senate
Rees G. Richards (1842–1917), Ohio State Senate
Vargrave Richards (born 1950), Senate of the U.S. Virgin Islands
William L. Richards (1881–1941), Wisconsin State Senate